754 Naval Air Squadron (754 NAS) was a Naval Air Squadron of the Royal Navy's Fleet Air Arm. It was active as an Observer Training Squadron from 1939 to 1944 as part of No.2 Observer School. It initially operated out of RNAS Lee-on-Solent and then moved to RNAS Arbroath where four years later, it disbanded. It then briefly reformed as a Training Squadron when 744 Naval Air Squadron was re-designated 754 Naval Air Squadron in June 1944 at RNAS Yarmouth, Nova Scotia, until March 1945.

History of 754 NAS

Observer Training Squadron (1939 - 1944) 

754 Naval Air Squadron formed at RNAS Lee-on-Solent (HMS Daedalus), situated near Lee-on-the-Solent in Hampshire, approximately four miles west of Portsmouth, on 24 May 1939, as an Observer Training Squadron and being part of No.2 Observer School. It was initially equipped with Seafox I, Walrus I and Vega Gull aircraft. In the following February, in 1940, the squadron then acquired Proctor IA, II and IIA aircraft.

754 NAS moved to RNAS Arbroath (HMS Condor), located near Arbroath in East Angus, Scotland, on the 7 September 1940, gaining Harvard IIb and Swordfish, but only retaining the Proctor aircraft. From June 1941 the squadron started operating  Lysander IIIa for training duties and by November they were the only aircraft used. In February 1943 Albacore I arrived, however, by December they were gone and the squadron was back to only operating the Lysanders. In January 1944 Reliant I arrived, however, on the 27 March 1944, 754 NAS disbanded at Arbroath.

Naval Air Gunnery School (1944 - 1945) 
It then reformed as a Training Squadron when 744 Naval Air Squadron was re-designated 754 Naval Air Squadron in June 1944 at RNAS Yarmouth, located in Yarmouth County, Nova Scotia, Canada, and was part of the British Commonwealth Air Training Plan until disbanding in March 1945, when the Naval Air Gunner School ceased operations.

Aircraft flown

754 Naval Air Squadron has flown a number of different aircraft types, including:
Fairey Seafox I (May 1939 - Sep 1940)
Supermarine Walrus I (May 1939 - Sep 1940)
Percival Vega Gull (May 1939 - Mar 1940)
Percival Proctor Ia (Feb 1940 - Nov 1941)
Percival Proctor II (Feb 1940 - Nov 1941)
Percival Proctor IIa (Feb 1940 - Nov 1941)
North American Harvard III
Westland Lysander Mk.IIIA (Jun 1941 - Mar 1944)
Fairey Albacore I (Feb 1943 - Dec 1943)
Stinson Reliant (Jan 1944 - Mar 1944)
Fairey Swordfish II (Jun 1944 - Mar 1945)

Naval Air Stations  

754 Naval Air Squadron operated from a number of naval air stations of the Royal Navy, in England, Scotland and overseas in Canada:
Royal Naval Air Station LEE-ON-SOLENT (24 May 1939 - 7 September 1940)
Royal Naval Air Station ARBROATH (7 September 1940 - 27 March 1944)
R.N. Air Section YARMOUTH (June 1944 - March 1945)

Commanding Officers 

List of commanding officers of 754 Naval Air Squadron with month and year of appointment and end:
Lt-Cdr E. Esmonde, RN (May 1939-May 1940)
Lt-Cdr E. J. E. Burt, RN (May 1940-Jan 1941)
Lt-Cdr H. E. S. Pritchett, RNVR (Jan 1941-Apr 1942)
Lt-Cdr A. F. E. Payen, RNVR (Apr 1942-May 1942)
Lt-Cdr D. A. Horton, RNVR (May 1942-Oct 1943)
Lt-Cdr W. E. Davis, RNVR (Oct 1943-Mar 1944)

References

Citations

Bibliography

700 series Fleet Air Arm squadrons
Military units and formations established in 1939
Military units and formations of the Royal Navy in World War II